Daniel Landa (born 4 November 1968) is a Czech musician, actor, car racer, and amateur muay thai fighter. Born in Prague, Landa graduated with honours from Prague Conservatory, having studied music and drama. He began his musical career in 1988 when he, along with David Matásek, founded the oi! band Orlík, with whom he released two albums. Orlík has been criticized for its racial overtones, targeting specifically the Gypsy minority in the Czech Republic. In 1993, he began recording as a solo artist, and has since released numerous albums. He has also composed music for films and written several musicals. His material often deals with patriotic and political themes.

Career

Orlík
In 1988, together with the actor David Matásek, Landa founded the oi! punk band Orlík, whose name was inspired by the eponymous bar in Prague. In 1990, they released their first studio album, Miloš Frýba for president (Oi!), which saw significant success. The album gained prominence within the Czechoslovak skinhead movement, and it promoted racist and white supremacist themes, which garnered the band some criticism in the press and the general public. The following year, they released a second, similarly controversial album, Demise, after which they broke up.

Solo career
Landa began his solo career in 1993 by releasing the album Valčík, followed by Chcíply dobrý víly in 1995, Pozdrav z fronty in 1997, Smrtihlav (1998), and Konec (1999). In 2000, he issued his first compilation album, titled Best of Landa. 9mm argumentů came out in 2002, succeeded by Neofolk in 2004. That same year, he released his second compilation, titled Best of Landa 2.
Landa toured extensively between 2003 and 2008, and released the live albums Vltava Tour in 2003 and Bouře in 2006.
In 2009, after a break of several years, he issued his next studio album, Nigredo. This was followed by more touring, two additional live albums, Československo Tour 2008 (2011) and Vozová hradba Daniel Landa tour 2011 (2012), two more compilations, and the album Klíč králů in 2013. In 2015, Žito was released.

Acting and theatre
Landa has occasionally dabbled in acting, having appeared in several films, including Why?, Who's That Soldier?, Černí baroni, as well as the German television series Alles außer Mord and the Czech series České století, in which he portrays the soldier Emanuel Moravec. He has also acted in two of his wife's films, Kvaska and Tacho.

Since the early 2000s, Landa has written music for several films, including Kvaska, and theatre productions. He has appeared in Dracula, Krysař, and Tajemství, the last two of which he wrote himself.
In 2008, he wrote music for Mirjam Landa's musical Touha together with  Ondřej Soukup, which was based on the film Kvaska.
Landa wrote music for the play Tajemství zlatého draka (The secret of the golden dragon), which premiered in November 2008.
In 2003, in collaboration with German composer Stefan Wurz, he reworked Mozart's Requiem into a rock performance titled Rockquiem, which was performed at Prague's Municipal House.

Racing

Since 1996, Landa has been an autocross racer, at one point reaching 6th place in Europe. In 1998, he also began truck racing, and in 1999, he was named newcomer of the year in the Czech Republic. Since 2001, he has been an N4 category rally racer.

Malina Foundation
The Malina Foundation (Nadace Malina), founded by Landa and professional rally driver Roman Kresta, focuses on education and prevention in the field of road safety. They have made several educational films, including, Bourá jen blb? (Do only idiots crash?), Auto je zbraň (Cars are weapons), and Tacho (Tachometer).

Kouzelník Žito 44
At the end of November 2012, Landa announced the end of his musical career. He stopped using his name and started to call himself Kouzelník Žito 44 (Magician Rye 44). He caused a major controversy with his speech at the 2012 Český slavík Awards ceremony. According to some reports, he openly threatened the audience; according to others, he was a man suffering from a personal crisis. In 2016, Landa stopped using the moniker.

COVID-19 pandemic
During the COVID-19 pandemic in the Czech Republic, Landa has engaged in activism against the Czech government's epidemiological measures. He used the website zlatyspendlik.cz to encourage people to carry out denial-of-service attacks against regional public health offices. His followers sent thousands of emails to health offices asking for information, to which the health offices were forced to respond, resulting in them becoming overloaded. In November 2021, the Czech Ministry of Health filed a criminal complaint against Landa on grounds of sabotage.

Personal life

In 1990, Landa married Mirjam Müller, who was at the time a film directing student at the FAMU in Prague. Müller is originally from Cologne, Germany. They have 3 children together, Anastasia (born 1998), and twins Rosalia and Roxana (born 2003).

Discography

with Orlík
 Miloš Frýba for president (Oi!) (1990)
 Demise (Resignation, 1991)

Solo
Studio albums
 Valčík (Waltz, 1993)
 Chcíply dobrý víly (The Good Fairies Died, 1995)
 Pozdrav z fronty (Greetings from the Battlefront, 1997)
 Smrtihlav (Death's head, 1998) - with other artists
 Konec (The End, 1999)
 9mm argumentů (9mm of Arguments, 2002)
 Neofolk (2004)
 Nigredo (2009)
 Klíč králů (Key of Kings, 2013)
 Žito (Rye, 2015)

Live albums
 Vltava Tour (2003)
 Bouře (Storm, 2006)
 Československo Tour 2008 (2011)
 Vozová hradba Daniel Landa tour 2011 (2012)

Compilations
 Best of Landa (2000)
 Best of Landa 2 (2004)
 Platinum Collection (2010, 3 CDs)
 Best of Landa 3 (2013)

Soundtracks
 Krysař I. (The Pied Piper I, 1996) - with other artists
 Krysař II. (The Pied Piper II, 1996) - with other artists
 Tajemství (The Secret, 2005) – with other artists
 Kvaska (2007)
 Touha (Desire, 2009)
 Tacho (2010)

Other appearances
 Večer s písní Karla Kryla pro český národ live recording of songs by Karel Kryl, with other artists (2004)
 Strážce plamene with Petr Hapka & Michal Horáček (2006)
 Strážce plamene v obrazech (video) with Hapka & Horáček (2007)

Filmography
 Třetí patro (TV) (1985)
 Případ Kolman (TV) (1986)
 Why? (1987)
 Who's That Soldier? (1987)
 Kainovo znamení (1989)
 Jen o rodinných záležitostech (1990)
 Tichá bolest (1990)
 Černí baroni (1992)
 Alles außer Mord (TV) (1995, 1996)
 Kvaska (2007)
 Tacho (2010)
 České století (2013)
 Die Geliebte des Teufels (production) (2016)

Theatre productions
 Krysař (1996)
 Rockquiem (2003)
 Tajemství (2005)

References

External links

 

1968 births
Living people
Musicians from Prague
21st-century Czech male singers
Czech Muay Thai practitioners
Prague Conservatory alumni
20th-century Czech male singers